Francesc Torrescassana i Sallarés (1845, Barcelona - 1 March 1918, Barcelona) was a Catalan painter; primarily of landscapes.

Biography 
From 1859 to 1865, he attended the Escola de la Llotja in Barcelona, where he studied with Ramón Martí Alsina, and had his first showing in 1864 at the National Exhibition of Fine Arts. It is not known if he received a stipend to continue his studies in Rome, but he likely went to Paris, where two of his works were presented at the Exposition Universelle in 1867. Two years later, he travelled to the Suez Canal, to attend the opening ceremonies and paint the first Spanish ship to cross through. 

He was a regular exhibitor at the Sala Parés and, from 1891, the Exposición General de Bellas Artes en Barcelona. Although his initial presentation was well-received, the large history painting he featured at the exposition of 1894 was criticized for being overambitious and unnatural.

However, the largest display of his canvases, thirty-four in total, is in the dining room of the Casa Vicens; from the personal collection of the stockbroker, Manel Vicens (1836-1895).

References

Further reading 
 Alcolea, Santiago, Pintures de la Universitat de Barcelona. Catàleg, Universitat de Barcelona, 1980,

External links 

Spanish painters
Painters from Catalonia
Spanish landscape painters
Painters from Barcelona
1845 births
1918 deaths